{{Infobox film
| name           = Baahubali: The Beginning
| image          = Baahubali The Beginning poster.jpg
| alt            = 
| caption        = Theatrical release poster in Telugu
| director       = S. S. Rajamouli
| producer       = Shobu Yarlagadda and Prasad Devineni
| screenplay     = S. S. Rajamouli
| story          = V. Vijayendra Prasad
| starring       = PrabhasRana DaggubatiAnushka ShettyTamannaahRamya KrishnaSathyarajNassar
| music          = M. M. Keeravani
| cinematography = K. K. Senthil Kumar
| editing        = Kotagiri Venkateswara Rao
| studio         = Arka Media Works
| distributor    = 
Arka Media Works Global United Media Studio Green, Sri Thenandal Films Dharma Productions, AA Films 
| released       = 
| runtime        = 158 minutes 159 minutes 
| country        = India
| language       = TeluguTamil
| budget         =  
| gross          =  {{efn|Box Office India mentioned it as ₹647.81 crore. While India Today and The Indian Express mentioned the collection as ₹659crore. But Firstpost said that the collection was ₹650 crore.}}
}}Baahubali: The Beginning is a 2015 Indian epic action film co-written and directed by S. S. Rajamouli, and produced by Shobu Yarlagadda and Prasad Devineni under Arka Media Works. The film was produced in Tollywood, the centre of Telugu language films in India, and was filmed in both Telugu and Tamil languages simultaneously. It features Prabhas in a dual role alongside Rana Daggubati, Anushka Shetty, Tamannaah, Ramya Krishna, Sathyaraj, and Nassar. The first of two cinematic parts, the film follows Sivudu, an adventurous young man who helps his love Avantika rescue Devasena, the former queen of Mahishmati who is now a prisoner under the tyrannical rule of king Bhallaladeva. The story concludes in Baahubali 2: The Conclusion.The film's story was written by Rajamouli's father V. Vijayendra Prasad, who randomly told him a story about Sivagami, a woman who carries a baby in her hand while crossing a river, and a few years later about Kattappa, which intrigued Rajamouli. His fascination with Mahabharata and the tales of Amar Chitra Katha and Chandamama further fuelled his interest in the story. However, it took the writers three months to complete the final draft. The soundtrack and background score were composed by M. M. Keeravani while the cinematography, production design, and VFX were handled by K. K. Senthil Kumar, Sabu Cyril and V. Srinivas Mohan respectively.

The film was made on a budget of 180 crore ($28 million), making it the most expensive Indian film at its time of release. The film opened worldwide on 10 July 2015 along with the dubbed versions in Hindi and Malayalam. It received nationwide and universal acclaim for Rajamouli's direction, story, visual effects, cinematography, themes, action sequences, music, and performances, and became a record-breaking box office success. It was also praised by the actors of the film industry alike and, along with its successor, is widely regarded as one of the greatest Indian epic action films. With a worldwide box office gross of 650 crore ($101 million) it became the highest-grossing South Indian film and the second highest-grossing Indian film worldwide. It is currently the eleventh highest-grossing Indian film worldwide. Its Hindi dubbed version also broke several records by becoming the highest-grossing dubbed film in Hindi of all time. Both budget and box office records have since been surpassed by Baahubali 2: The Conclusion, the highest grossing film of all time in India.  

The Telugu version of Baahubali: The Beginning became the first Indian film to be nominated for American Saturn Awards, receiving five nominations at the 42nd ceremony, including Best Fantasy Film and Best Supporting Actress. It received several accolades such as the National Film Award for Best Feature Film, and the National Award for Best Special Effects. At the 63rd Filmfare Awards South it won five awards from ten nominations, including Best Telugu Film, Best Director - Telugu for Rajamouli and Best Supporting Actress - Telugu for Ramya Krishna respectively.

 Plot 
Near the ancient Indian kingdom of Mahishmati, an injured woman named Shivagami exits a cave underneath a mountain waterfall, carrying an infant. She kills two soldiers pursuing her and attempts to cross a raging river, but slips and is washed away in the current. Before drowning, she holds the baby aloft and prays to Lord Siva, explaining that she doesn't care about her life and wishes that the baby, Mahendra Baahubali must live. The child is saved by the people of the local Amburi tribe, who reside near the river and worship Lord Shiva. The wife of the tribe's chieftain, Sanga, decides to adopt the boy and names him Shivudu.

Shivudu grows up to be an ambitious and mischievous child, obsessed with ascending the mountain. Despite Sanga's pleas, he tries many times to scale the cliffs but always fails. As a young man, he is shown to possess superhuman strength when he lifts a Lingam of Lord Siva and places it at the foot of the mountain. A mask then falls from the cliffs, and realizing it possesses feminine features, Shivudu finally succeeds in scaling the mountain in order to find the woman the mask belongs. Upon reaching the top, he sees a beautiful woman named Avantika fighting Mahishmati soldiers. He discovers that she is a member of a local resistance group dedicated to overthrowing the tyrannical king of Mahishmati, Lord Bhallaladeva, and rescuing royal captive Princess Devasena. Shivudu is immediately smitten with Avantika and secretly follows her, even managing to draw a tattoo on her hand while she sleeps. When she discovers Shivudu she attacks him, but he outmaneuvers her and returns her mask. Realizing he scaled the entire mountain to find her, she reciprocates his feelings.
The pair are later attacked by more soldiers, and after defeating them, Shivudu pledges to rescue Devasena himself and departs for Mahishmati. He secretly enters the city on Bhallaladeva’s birthday and assists in erecting a gigantic statue of the king. In the process, he is recognized by a worker, who then leads the other workers in chanting 'Baahubali,' to Shivudu's confusion and Bhallaladeva's displeasure. Shivudu later infiltrates the royal palace disguised as a soldier and distracts Bhallaladeva and his guards long enough for him to rescue Devasena. Bhallaladeva sends his son, Bhadra, and the royal family's loyal slave Kattappa to recapture Devasena. In the ensuing fight, Shivudu beheads Bhadra as both the Amburi tribe and resistance warriors arrive. Kattappa lunges at Shivudu, but stops short of attacking him upon seeing his face. He falls into submission at Shivudu's feet, proclaiming him to be "Baahubali".

The next morning, Kattappa reveals to Shivudu that Shivudu is actually Mahendra Baahubali, the son of Amarendra Baahubali, a famous warrior prince from Mahishmati. Amarendra Baahubali was born an orphan; his father, King Vikramadeva, died before he was born and his mother died giving birth to him. Lord Bijjaladeva, Vikramadeva's brother and the next in line for the throne, is denied the position due to his scheming nature, and as such Bijjaladeva's wife, Lady Shivagami, assumes power with the intention of raising both her son Bhallaladeva and the orphaned Baahubali in an equal manner to select the next heir to the throne. While the two are raised as brothers and trained rigorously in numerous subjects, Bhallaladeva retains the power-hungry nature of his father while the affable Baahubali becomes beloved by the kingdom.

A traitor named Saketudu turns out to be a spy for the savage Kaalakeya tribe, known as destroyers of kingdoms. Their chief Inkoshi declares war on Mahishmati, and Shivagami decides that whoever kills Inkoshi will be crowned king. Bijjaladeva secretly supplies Bhallaladeva with more weapons and men, but Baahubali still defeats more raiders than Bhallaladeva by using innovative tactics and by inspiring his soldiers. While Bhallaaladeva kills Inkoshi, Baahubali's valour and concern for the people of his kingdom convinces Shivagami to make Baahubali heir apparent.

In the present day, Shivudu's adoptive parents, impressed by Kattappa's story, wish to meet Baahubali. A dejected Kattappa explains that Amarendra Baahubali is dead, and upon being questioned by Sivudu, he reveals that the traitor who murdered Baahubali was none other than him, setting a path for a sequel. Kattapa is revealed to be the side companion of Mahendra's father.

 Cast 

 Credited 
The following is the credited cast:
 Prabhas in a dual role as
Amarendra Baahubali, the crown prince of Maahishmati (Telugu) / Magizhmathi (Tamil), nephew of Sivagami and Bijjaladeva, Father of Mahendra Baahubali and adored member of the kingdom
 Mahendra Baahubali "Sivudu" (Telugu) / "Sivu" (Tamil)
 Rana Daggubati as Bhallaaladeva Chakravarti (Telugu) / Palvaalthevan (Tamil), Baahubali's older cousin and a spoiled, arrogant prince with tyrannical aspirations for taking the throne.
 Anushka Shetty as Devasena (Telugu) / Devasenai (Tamil), Mahendra Baahubali's biological mother, who has been tortured and imprisoned in Maahishmati (Telugu) / Magizhmathi (Tamil).
Tamannaah as Avantika, a former resident of Kuntala, skilled combatant, and powerful member of the resistance.
Ramya Krishna as Sivagaami, Bijjaladeva's wife, Bhallaaladeva Chakravarti's mother, and an established high ranking member of the royal family, who oversees the kingdom while the princes grow up
 Sathyaraj as Karikala Kattappa, the general of armed forces, a mentor and combat teacher to the royals of Mahishmati (Telugu) / Magizhmathi (Tamil). Despite this his status is equal to that of a servant and comes from a long line of slave warriors bound to the kingdom's monarch.
 Nassar as Bijjaladeva (Telugu) / Pingalathevan (Tamil), the deranged older brother of Vikramadeva and rejected prince, who has a deformed left arm.

 Others 
 Rohini as Sanga, leader of the Amburi tribe and Mahendra's adoptive mother
 Meka Ramakrishna as Jaya Varma, leader of the Kuntala rebels and Devasena's brother.
 Tanikella Bharani as Swamiji, an Amburi sage who has devoted himself to Shiva's prayer.
 Adivi Sesh as Bhadrudu (Telugu) / Bhadra (Tamil), Bhallaladeva's adoptive son, who has taken an arrogant and controlling personality alike his father.
 Prabhakar as the Inkoshi, King of Kalkeyas, who took leadership as a young boy and declares war on Mahishmati (Telugu) / Magizhmathi (Tamil) after their failed truce.
 Sudeepa as Aslam Khan, an Arabian weapon's dealer who befriends Kattappa.
 Charandeep as Inkoshi's brother
 Teja Kakumanu as Saketudu (Telugu) / Saketan (Tamil), a traitor who tells the Kalakeyas information about Mahishmati (Telugu) / Magizhmathi (Tamil)
 Madhu Sneha Upaadhyaay as dancer in blue blouse in song "Manohari"
 Nora Fatehi as dancer in green blouse in song "Manohari"
 Scarlett Mellish Wilson as dancer in orange blouse in song "Manohari"
S. S. Rajamouli, as the spirit seller before the song "Manohari"

 Production Baahubali: The Beginning was produced in Tollywood, the centre of Telugu language films in India and was filmed in both Telugu and Tamil languages simultaneously. , the film series was considered the most expensive in India.

 Development 
Director S. S. Rajamouli revealed that Baahubali is inspired by the epic Mahabharata. V. Vijayendra Prasad, the screenwriter and Rajamouli's father who wrote stories for most of Rajamouli's films, once again penned the story for Baahubali. Vijayendra Prasad revealed that Sivagami has shades of both Kunti and Kaikeyi while Devasena is a warrior like Sita. He further added that he sees Baahubali as the story of Sivagami and Devasena. He was also inspired by tales of Chandamama and Amar Chitra Katha comics.

In February 2011, S. S. Rajamouli announced that Prabhas would star in his upcoming movie. In January 2013, he announced that the working title was Baahubali. Actual film production started at Rock Gardens in Kurnool on 6 July 2013. The waterfall scenes were shot at Athirappilly Falls in Kerala, huge sets for the Mahishmati kingdom were constructed at Ramoji Film City in Hyderabad, and the snow episodes in the film were shot in Bulgaria. The film boasts of one year pre-production work wherein 15,000 storyboard sketches for the film were created—the highest for any Indian Film as of this date. More than 90 percent of the film had visually enhanced shots and, according to the producer, more than 600 VFX artists worked for the film from 18 facilities around the world led by Makuta VFX and Firefly in Hyderabad, Prasad Studios in Hyderabad and Chennai, Annapurna Studios in Hyderabad, Tau Films, and Dancing Digital Animation and Macrograph in South Korea. Makuta VFX which had prior experience of working with S.S.Rajamouli was chosen as principal visual effects studio. The cinematography of the movie was done by KK Senthil Kumar for 380 days using Arri Alexa XT camera with Master Prime lens. This marked Rajamouli's first film using digital imagery.

Most of the film was shot in ArriRaw format in 4:3 aspect ratio while ArriRaw 16.9 was used for slow motion shots at 120 fps. Open Gate format, which can use the full 3.4K sensor in the camera to produce frames larger than the standard ArriRaw format, was tapped in to get the maximum image quality in VFX shots. Production designer Sabu Cyril created 10,000 different kinds of weaponry including swords, helmets and armour required for the soldiers. To make the swords lightweight, carbon-fibre was used instead of steel. 3D printing technology was used to create the head of the 100-foot Bhallaladeva statue in the movie. Flexi foam was used to make lightweight armour with the look of leather. V. Srinivas Mohan was chosen as visual effects supervisor, and Kotagiri Venkateswara Rao was the editor. P. M. Satheesh was the sound designer and Peter Hein was responsible for the action sequences. The costume designers were Rama Rajamouli and Prasanthi Tipirneni. The line producer was M. M. Srivalli.
 Visual effects 
National Award winner V. Srinivas Mohan was roped in as Visual effects supervisor for Baahubali. Makuta VFX which is based out of Hyderabad was chosen as principal visual effects studio and was responsible for more than 50% of the computer-generated imagery in the film. The majority of work done by Makuta involved bringing the 1500 foot waterfall to life, creating mountains and landscapes including the kingdom of Mahishmati, with its massive temples and courtyards. Creating the waterfall took nearly two years as Makuta dealt with complexity in fluid dynamics and simulations. Manuka claimed each frame of the waterfall sequence was treated as creating a new set and employed a different set of methodology.

Firefly Creative Studio of Hyderabad worked primarily on the avalanche and the war sequences, which account for nearly 25 minutes of the film. Firefly Creative was also involved in creating underwater VFX shots and in establishing backstories for Kalakeya characters. Tau Films was responsible for creating the CGI bison, while Prasad EFX from Hyderabad was responsible for some shots in pre and post battle episodes involving digital multiplication. Prasad also created a 3D image of Kattappa and mapped his head onto a duplicate actor in one of the scenes.

Srushti VFX from Hyderabad was involved in digitally creating some of the shots in the war sequence along with Firefly Studios. Annapurna Studios from Hyderabad was chosen as digital intermediate partner for the film which is responsible for generating the digital feed with the best colour and audio for editing. For the first time in Indian movies, Academy Color Encoding System workflows were implemented along with Infinitely Scalable Information Storage keeping in mind the scale of digitally enhanced shots in the film. Arka Media Works, production company of Baahubali, teamed up with AMD to use the state of the art FirePro GPUs W9100 and W8100 during post production.

In an interview with Quartz, the co-founder of Makuta VFX stated, "Most of Baahubali was developed in Hyderabad, home to Tollywood, and used local talent. It was principally a homegrown feature produced by homegrown talent."

 Kiliki language 

The fictional language Kiliki (also referred to as Kilikili) spoken by the Kalakeyas, a ferocious warrior tribe, was created by Madhan Karky for the film. It is said to be the first fictional language to be created for Indian film.

While Karky was pursuing a PhD in Australia, he took up a part-time job of teaching and baby-sitting children. During one such interaction, he thought it would be fun to create a new language that could be easily grasped. Basic words were first made up and opposites were represented by word reversals – me was min and you was nim. The language, with 100 words, was called "Click" to highlight its simplicity. This formed the foundation for Kiliki.
 Kilikili consists of at least 750 words and more than 40 concrete grammar rules.
 It was designed to be an intuitive language: Karky said he used hard consonants and soft consonants depending on the nature of the words' meanings.
 The language was created keeping in mind that the Kalakeya warriors had to be portrayed as terrifying brutes.
 The language sounds the same in all the versions – Telugu, Tamil, Hindi and Malayalam – of Baahubali.
On 21 February 2020, on the occasion of International Mother Language Day, Rajamouli launched the official website of Kiliki language. He called the language as "world's youngest and easiest language."

 Music 

Rajamouli's cousin M. M. Keeravani composed the music and background score for this film and the sound supervision was done by Kalyan Koduri. The Telugu version of the soundtrack album was released on 31 May 2015, at the Sri Venkateswara University Grounds. The album of the film's Tamil version was released on 7 June 2015, while the soundtrack of the Hindi and Malayalam versions, were released on 21 June and 1 July respectively.

 Release 

The release of The Beginning was postponed many times for several reasons.

 Screenings and statistics 
The film was released on 10 July 2015 in 4,000 screens worldwide in Telugu, Tamil, Hindi and Malayalam languages. A record number of 1600 screens in Telugu, 1500 screens in Hindi, 350 in Tamil and 225 screens in Malayalam were booked for the release. The film was released in the USA a day earlier by BlueSky Cinemas in 135 screens. A premier show was also held on 9 July at Prasads IMAX Hyderabad. The film's release in Kerala was hindered by the shutdown of a number of theatres due to the piracy issue of the Malayalm film Premam and released in only a few theatres. The international version of the film (20 minutes shorter than the original one) was screened at Busan International Film Festival. Producers announced plans to release the film in China in November 2015 by E Stars Films. The producer, Shobu Yarlagadda, revealed his plans to release the movie in Latin America, Germany and European countries. Arka International made arrangements to release the movie in Germany and 70 other territories.

As the sequel Baahubali: The Conclusion was released on 28 April 2017, the producers and distributors re-released the first part (Hindi) on 7 April 2017. The film was screened at various film festivals like Open Cinema Strand of Busan International Film Festival, Indian Film Festival The Hague, Sitges Film Festival in Spain, Utopiales Film Festival in France, Golden Horse Film Festival in Taipei, Taiwan, Tallinn Black Nights Film Festival in Estonia, L'Etrange International Film Festival in Paris, Five Flavours Film Festival in Poland, Hawaii International Film Festival in Honolulu, Brussels International Fantastic Film Festival in Brussels, Belgium, Cannes Film Festival in France, Transilvania International Film Festival in Romania, Le Grand Rex in Paris, Kurja Polt Horror Film Festival, Festival de Lacamo, 8th BRICS summit, and the 2016 Indian Panorama section of the International Film Festival of India, Goa. The international version of the film was released in China, Japan, Korea, Taiwan, Indonesia, Thailand, Vietnam, Laos, Cambodia, Myanmar, Philippines, Timor-Leste, and some European and Latin American countries. 

 Marketing 
The movie was marketed by a Mumbai-based company named Spice PR owned by Prabhat Choudhary. The popular statement 'Kattappa ne Baahubali ko kyun maara?' was also coined by Prabhat Choudhary. Marketing of the film started two years before the shoot by S. S. Rajamouli with the audition campaign in Facebook and YouTube. A number of short promotional making-of videos were released on ArkaMediaworks YouTube channel and the team unveiled first look posters and videos featuring the film's lead stars on the occasions of their birthdays. The film used an augmented reality application to play the trailer on smart phones and tablets. The crown used by the character of Baahubali in the film was exhibited at Comic Con, Hyderabad, as a part of the film's promotion. A cosplay event was held in which chosen winners were given a chance to visit the sets of the film. The film's unit also launched a WhatsApp messenger to give regular updates about the film to the subscribers. On 22 July 2015, Guinness World Records approved the poster created during the audio launch of Baahubali in Kochi on 1 July 2015 as the world's largest poster. The poster has an area of 4,793.65 m2 (51,598.21 ft2) and it was created by Global United Media Company Pvt Ltd. This record was later broken by a 5,969.61 m2  poster for the film MSG-2 The Messenger.

Producers announced plans to create a film museum at Ramoji Film City in Hyderabad to showcase the weapons, armour, and costumes used by actors in the film. The museum would be the first of its kind for any Indian movie. The film's website hosts merchandise which includes apparel, accessories, and film collectibles.

 Distribution 
Though he did not confirm the price, Dil Raju said in an interview to Deccan Chronicle that he purchased the first part's Nizam region rights and added that he would acquire the rights of the second part also for this region. BlueSky Cinemas, Inc. acquired the theatrical screening and distribution rights in United States and Canada.

The Telugu version of the film was presented by K. Raghavendra Rao, Tamil version by K.E. Gnanavel Raja, Sri Thenandal Films and UV Creations, Karan Johar presented the Hindi version and Global United Media presented the Malayalam theatrical version. Twin Co, an international film distributor in Japan, acquired the screening rights. MVP Entertainment is set to release the movie in Thailand, Vietnam, Laos, Cambodia, Myanmar, and Timor-Leste countries. Sun Distribution acquired the distribution rights of the movie in Latin American countries while Creative Century Entertainment got the rights for Taiwan. In Korea, the movie is scheduled to be released via Entermode Corp.
 Controversy 
The Tamil version of the film faced a controversy relating to a word used in the film. On 22 July 2015, activists of Dalit group Puratchi Pulikal Iyakkam hurled petrol bombs outside the 'Tamil, Jaya' multiplex in Madurai screening the Tamil version of the film. The Dalit group Puratchi Pulikal Iyakkam protested against the movie over the inclusion of the word 'pagadai' (gambler). Members of the group claimed the words, used by caste Hindus to address members of the Arunthathiyar Dalit sub-caste, are considered derogatory against Dalits. Dialogue writer of Tamil version, Madhan Karky issued an apology for offending Dalits.

 Home media 
Arka Media Works gave the satellite rights to Star Maa and the Malayalam dubbed version was also given the satellite rights to Mazhavil Manorama. The Tamil version was given to Jaya TV. The Kannada dubbed version was given to Colors Kannada. The Hindi dubbed version was given the satellite rights to Sony Max. The Odia dubbed version of this movie was given to Zee Sarthak. The Bhojpuri dubbed version of the movie was later given to Bhojpuri Cinema. The Marathi dubbed version of this movie was given to Shemaroo Marathibana. The Bengali dubbed version of this movie was given to Enterr10 Bangla.

Netflix acquired the digital rights for streaming all languages of the film.

 Reception 
 Critical response 

 India 
Deepanjana Pal of Firstpost called it "Rajamouli's tour de force", terming it as "elaborate, well-choreographed and [having] some breathtaking moments." Prabhas and Dagubatti are both in their elements as the warriors who approach warfare in two distinctive styles. The outcome of the battle is no surprise, but there are enough clever tactics and twists to keep the audience hooked. The biggest surprise, however, lies in the film's final shot, which gives you a glimpse into the sequel that will come out next year." Saibal Chatterjee of NDTV India rated the film with three stars out of five and stated, "The spectacular universe that the film conjures up is filled with magic, but the larger-than-life characters that populate its extraordinary expanse do not belong to any known mythic landscape. To that extent, Baahubali, driven by the titular superhero who pulls off mind-boggling feats both in love and in war, throws up many a surprise that isn't altogether meaningless."

Shubhra Gupta of The Indian Express praised the film: "Right from its opening frames, Baahubali holds out many promises: of adventure and romance, love and betrayal, valour and weakness. And it delivers magnificently on each of them. This is full-tilt, fully-assured filmmaking of a very high order. Baahubali is simply spectacular." In her review for The Hindu, Sangeetha Devi Dundoo wrote, "The war formations that form a chunk of the latter portions of the film are the best we've seen in Indian cinema so far. These portions are spectacular and show the technical finesse of the cinematographer (K.K. Senthil Kumar) and the visual effects teams. The waterfall, the mystical forests and water bodies above the cliffs and the lead pair escaping an avalanche all add to the spectacle. Give into its magic, without drawing comparisons to Hollywood flicks."

Sukanya Varma of Rediff gave the film four out of five stars, calling it "mega, ingenious and envelope pushing!" Rachit Gupta of Filmfare gave the film four stars (out of 5) and summarised, "Baahubali is truly an epic experience. Had the story not been so jaded, this would've gone into the history books as an all-time classic. But that's not the case. It has its set of storytelling flaws, but even those are overshadowed by Rajamouli's ideas and execution. This is definitely worthy of being India's most expensive film. It's a definite movie watching experience."

Suparna Sharma of Deccan Chronicle praised the second half of the film, writing, "Rajamouli has reserved all the grander and grandstanding for later, after interval. That's when the film stands up and begins to strut like an epic." Suhani Singh of India Today pointed out that the film is best enjoyed keeping logic at bay. She added, "SS Rajamouli and his team put up a fascinating wild, wild east adventure. It takes pluck to conceive a world like the one seen in Baahubali and to pull it off on a level which is on par with the international standards. The almost 45-minute-long battle sequence at the end is not just one of the biggest climaxes, but also the action spectacle rarely seen in Indian cinema. And if Rajamouli can present another one like that in part 2, then he is on course to register his name in cinema's history books. We can't wait to revisit Mahishmati kingdom."

Critical reception penned by Shubha Shetty Saha for Mid-Day rates the film with four stars out of five, exclaiming, "While watching Baahubali, you might have to periodically pick up your jaw off the floor. Because this is not merely a movie, it is an unbelievably thrilling fantasy ride." The review extends praising the aspects, "It is to the director's credit that every aspect of the film – action, mind-boggling set design and choreography – lives up to this epic film of gigantic scale. The choreography in the song that has Shiva disrobing Avantika to get her in touch with her feminine side, is an absolute gem."

 International 
Critics praised the film for its direction, technical values, and the actors' performances. Lisa Tsering based on The Hollywood Reporter wrote, "The story has been told many times before – a child is born destined for greatness and as a man vanquishes the forces of evil – but in the confident hands of accomplished South Indian director S.S. Rajamouli the tale gets potent new life in Baahubali: The Beginning." Allan Hunter, writing for Screen Daily noted that "The broad brushstrokes storytelling and the director's over-fondness for slow-motion sequences are among the film's failings but this is still a rousing film, easily accessible epic. There's rarely a dull moment in Baahubali: The Beginning, part one of a gung-ho, crowd-pleasing Telugu-language epic that has been shattering box-office records throughout India."

Mike McCahill of The Guardian rated the film four stars out of five, praising the film, "Rajamouli defers on the latter for now, but his skilful choreography of these elements shucks off any cynicism one might carry into Screen 1: wide-eyed and wondrous, his film could be a blockbuster reboot, or the first blockbuster ever made, a reinvigoration of archetypes that is always entertaining, and often thrilling, to behold." Suprateek Chatterjee of The Huffington Post wrote, "However, all said and done, Baahubali: The Beginning is a remarkable achievement. What Rajamouli has pulled off here, despite its flaws, is nothing short of a miracle, especially when you take into account India's notoriously risk-averse filmmaking environment and when the film ends on a tantalizing cliffhanger (paving the way for Baahubali: The Conclusion, due to release next year), one can't help but applaud his singularly brave vision. As the cliché goes, a journey of a thousand miles must begin with a single step, but it doesn't really matter if that first step is shaky as long as it lands firmly and confidently."
 Box office Baahubali: The Beginning on the first day of its release collected  worldwide which was the highest opening ever for an Indian film until Kabali surpassed it in 2016 by earning . The film collected  from the United States on its first day. First weekend collections stood around  worldwide from all its versions, the biggest ever for an Indian film in india & the fourth biggest ever for an Indian film worldwide. The film grossed around  worldwide in the first week of its release. It became the first South Indian film to gross  worldwide, reaching there in 9 days, and subsequently grossed  worldwide in 15 days. And has successfully crossed  mark in 24 days. By the end of 50 days, International Business Times estimated that the film grossed an approximate  crore worldwide. International Business Times later reported that overall collections of the film stood at over  worldwide . Baahubali: The Beginning netted 420.05 crore in India. Firstpost later reported that the total collections stood at ₹650 crore . By the end of its 87-day run, Bahubali collected 586.45 crore (US$79 million) worldwide in its initial theatrical run.The Beginning opened to 100 percent occupancy in Andhra Pradesh and Telangana and close to 70 percent occupancy in Tamil Nadu, Kerala and Karnataka. The Hindi version earned around  nett which was the highest opening for any film dubbed into Hindi. Baahubali grossed  on the first day in India. The Hindi version grossed around  nett in the first weekend.

The Telugu version alone earned around  nett in first weekend in India. The film, from all its versions, earned almost  nett in its first weekend. It had the biggest opening weekend ever in India. The Hindi version collected around  nett in its first week. Baahubali: The Beginning grossed more than  nett from all its versions in India in the first week. It added a further  nett in its second weekend to take its total to around  nett in ten days. The Hindi version grossed over  nett in the Mumbai circuit.

The film opened on the ninth spot for its weekend, collecting around US$3.5 million with a per-screen average of $15,148. The film debuted in the ninth position for the US and Canadian box office collecting $4,630,000 for three days and $3,250,000 for the weekend of 10–12 July 2015. Baahubali: The Beginning grossed £66,659 from its Telugu version in United Kingdom and Ireland and A$194,405 from its Tamil version in Australia in until its second weekend (17 – 19 July 2015). The film also grossed MYR 663,869 in Malaysia from its Tamil version. The film grossed  on its opening weekend in China. It has grossed a total of (77.8 million) in the country. The film totally earned $10.94 million at the overseas box office.

 Accolades 

At the 63rd National Film Awards, Baahubali: The Beginning won the Best Feature Film, becoming the first Telugu film to win the award, and Best Special Effects. At the 63rd Filmfare Awards South, the Telugu version won five awards from ten nominations, including Best Film, Best Director for Rajamouli and Best Supporting Actress for Ramya Krishna respectively. Both the Tamil and Telugu versions won several awards in their respective categories, including Best Film, Best Director for Rajamouli, and Best Supporting Actress for Ramya Krishna at the 1st IIFA Utsavam. Baahubali: The Beginning became the first Indian film to be nominated for Saturn Awards, receiving five nominations at the 42nd ceremony, including Best Fantasy Film and Best Supporting Actress for Tamannaah.

 Legacy Baahubali: The Beginning is one of the films featured in BBC's documentary on 100 Years of Indian Cinema directed by Sanjeev Bhaskar. The second part, entitled Baahubali 2: The Conclusion was released worldwide on 28 April 2017. Post the success of the film, a film movement was started, i.e. Pan-India films.

In 2017, Kattappava Kanom, which was named after the character of Kattappa from the film, was released. In 2018, Netflix announced that they had ordered a web television prequel series called Baahubali: Before the Beginning. Sathyaraj is referred to as Kattappa in a scene from Kanaa (2018).

In 2022, during the promotion of RRR, Rajamouli announced that a third Baahubali'' film is in works.

Notes

References

External links 

 
 
 
 
 
 

Indian historical films
2015 films
2015 3D films
Indian 3D films
Baahubali (franchise)
2010s fantasy action films
2015 multilingual films
Indian fantasy action films
Indian epic films
Indian historical action films
Indian multilingual films
Fictional-language films
2010s Telugu-language films
2010s Tamil-language films
Films set in ancient India
Films shot in Alappuzha
Films shot in Chalakudy
Films shot in Thrissur
Films scored by M. M. Keeravani
Films directed by S. S. Rajamouli
Best Feature Film National Film Award winners
Films that won the Best Special Effects National Film Award
Films shot at Ramoji Film City
Films shot in Bulgaria
Indian films about revenge
2015 masala films